A Medihalli  is a village in the southern state of Karnataka, India. It is located in the Anekal taluk of Bangalore district in Karnataka.

See also
 Bangalore
 Districts of Karnataka

References

External links

Villages in Bangalore Urban district